Ploskoye is a rural locality (a settlement) in Rostilovskoye Rural Settlement, Gryazovetsky District, Vologda Oblast, Russia. The population was 562 as of 2002. There are 8 streets.

Geography 
Ploskoye is located 31 km south of Gryazovets (the district's administrative centre) by road. Pochinok is the nearest rural locality.

References 

Rural localities in Gryazovetsky District